Parliamentary elections were held in Togo on 21 March 1999. They were boycotted by the eight opposition parties, who been rebuffed in their insistence that talks following the controversial presidential elections the previous year must be completed prior to the parliamentary elections. As a result only three parties ran in the elections, the ruling Rally of the Togolese People (RPT), together with two small parties allied with it; the Coordination of New Forces and the Pan African Environmentalist Party. In addition, twelve independent candidates also ran.

The result was an overwhelming victory for the RPT, which won 79 of the 81 seats, the other two going to independents.

Results

References

Togo
Parliamentary election
Elections in Togo
Election and referendum articles with incomplete results
Togolese parliamentary election